Deth or DETH may refer to:

 Megadeth, an American heavy metal band
 Dethklok, an animated American death metal band
 Jack Deth, detective, main character in the Trancers films
 Richard Deth (1945– ), a controversial neuropharmacologist
 DETH (ΔΕΘ), the Thessaloniki International Fair

See also
 Death
 Death (disambiguation)